The men's freestyle flyweight competition at the 1964 Summer Olympics in Tokyo took place from 11 to 14 October at the Komazawa Gymnasium. Nations were limited to one competitor.

Competition format

This freestyle wrestling competition continued to use the "bad points" elimination system introduced at the 1928 Summer Olympics for Greco-Roman and at the 1932 Summer Olympics for freestyle wrestling, as adjusted at the 1960 Summer Olympics. Each bout awarded 4 points. If the victory was by fall, the winner received 0 and the loser 4. If the victory was by decision, the winner received 1 and the loser 3. If the bout was tied, each wrestler received 2 points. A wrestler who accumulated 6 or more points was eliminated. Rounds continued until there were 3 or fewer uneliminated wrestlers. If only 1 wrestler remained, he received the gold medal. If 2 wrestlers remained, point totals were ignored and they faced each other for gold and silver (if they had already wrestled each other, that result was used). If 3 wrestlers remained, point totals were ignored and a round-robin was held among those 3 to determine medals (with previous head-to-head results, if any, counting for this round-robin).

Results

Round 1

 Bouts

 Points

Round 2

Seven wrestlers had their second loss in round 2 and were eliminated, leaving 15 competitors to advance to round 3. Yoshida was the only wrestler left with 0 points.

 Bouts

 Points

Round 3

Four more wrestlers reached 6 or more points after taking a second loss in this round. Advancing to round 4 were 11 wrestlers, 7 of whom had 4 points and would be eliminated with a loss or tie. Chang and Yoshida each had only 1 point to lead the group.

 Bouts

 Points

Round 4

Five wrestlers were eliminated: Chimedbazaryn, Singh, and Grassi each had two losses; Niaz-Din had only one and Simons had not lost at all, but their accumulation of points from draws and wins by decision was enough to put them at 6 or more. Yoshida regained sole possession of the lead, staying at 1 point while Chang received a second. Three wrestlers stayed at 4 points, while Heidari moved from 3 to 5 with his tie.

 Bouts

 Points

Round 5

All four wrestlers that started the round with 4 points lost by decision and were eliminated in a three-way tie for 4th place. Heidari, who started with 5 points and had not lost any bout, was also eliminated because his win by decision gave him 6 points. Yoshida and Chang were the last two wrestlers remaining; they advanced to a final bout.

 Bouts

 Points

Final round

In a head-to-head final bout for the gold medal, Yoshida won by decision.

 Bouts

 Points

References

Wrestling at the 1964 Summer Olympics